Sean Robert Francis (born 1 August 1972) is a former footballer who played in the Football League for Birmingham City and Northampton Town, and in the League of Ireland for Cobh Ramblers, Shamrock Rovers and Longford Town. He played as a forward.

Career
Francis was born in Birmingham. He began his football career as a trainee with Birmingham City in 1988, and turned professional with that club in 1990. He made his Football League debut on 19 January 1991, as a substitute in a 3–0 defeat to Cambridge United in the Third Division, and made two more appearances from the bench that season. He spent time on loan at League of Ireland club Cobh Ramblers, for whom he made a scoring debut at home to UCD on 6 October 1991, before returning to Birmingham to make three more substitute appearances without scoring.

He joined Telford United of the Conference in July 1992, and played on loan for Worcester City in the Southern League, scoring once. At the beginning of the 1993–94 season, he played once for fourth-tier club Northampton Town, before moving to Ireland to rejoin Cobh Ramblers.

Francis joined Shamrock Rovers in 1995 and made his debut in August against St James's Gate. He went on to spend eight seasons at Rovers, during which he played twice in the 1998 UEFA Intertoto Cup. In October 1998 he went back to Cobh Ramblers on loan for the season.

Francis joined Longford Town in November 2002 and scored in that season's FAI Cup Final at Lansdowne Road as Longford won the first senior title in their history.

In August 2004 Francis moved to Kildare County F.C. His last League of Ireland goal was scored at St Colman's Park on 21 May 2005. He retired at the end of the 2005 League of Ireland season.

He served as the assistant manager of Waterford United until May 2008.

Francis is playing Saturday evening over-35s football with Kildare town AFC starting as their center forward, and has led them to double league and cup win during their 2013–2014 season.

Honours

 FAI Cup: 1
 Longford Town 2003
 FAI Super Cup: 1
 Shamrock Rovers 1998

References

1972 births
Living people
Footballers from Birmingham, West Midlands
Association football forwards
Birmingham City F.C. players
Cobh Ramblers F.C. players
Telford United F.C. players
Worcester City F.C. players
Northampton Town F.C. players
Shamrock Rovers F.C. players
Longford Town F.C. players
English Football League players
League of Ireland players
League of Ireland XI players
National League (English football) players
Southern Football League players
English footballers